Commandment Rock is a large rock located in the Lane Cove National Park, Sydney, New South Wales, Australia.  The site is home to rock engravings, both Aboriginal and European.  An engraving of the Fifth Commandment on the rock gives it its name.  It is reputed to have been carved in the late 19th century by a nearby resident, Thomas Tunbridge, as a punishment from his parents.  Erosion has caused this engraving to be invisible today.  Other engravings included a cannon, anchor, axe, sword, bow and arrow, and a crescent and "sunburst" motif, the only two Aboriginal engravings at the site.  A sign posted near the rock depicts the engravings as they used to be.

The site is easy to access, located just next to the road, and is adjoined by a covered picnic area. However, it is not recommended to walk on the site, as this will increase the rate of erosion and destruction of the engravings.

References

External links
 Commandment Rock picnic area, National Parks and Wildlife Service (New South Wales). Retrieved 12 September 2014

Inscribed rocks
Lane Cove, New South Wales